The Sultan of Sokoto is the ruler of the Sokoto Caliphate, a Sunni Muslim community in West Africa. The position may also be referred to as the Sokoto Caliph or the "Commander of the Faithful" (Amir-ul-Momineen in Arabic or Lamido Julbe in Fulani). The current holder of this title, since 2006, is Sa'adu Abubakar. 

The sultan of Sokoto is the leader of the Qadiriyya Sufi order, historically the most important Muslim position in Nigeria and senior to the Emir of Kano, the leader of the Tijaniyya Sufi order. The post has become increasingly ceremonial since British rule defeated the Caliphate and replaced it with the Sokoto Sultanate Council in 1903, but the Sultan – considered a spiritual leader in the Muslim community in Nigeria – can still carry much weight with Fulani and Hausa people from northern Nigeria. 

Usman dan Fodio, the founder of the dynasty of Sokoto State and of the Fulani Empire (consisting of the Fulbe Jihad states of which Sokoto was suzerain), never used the high style of Sultan but was simply titled Amir al-Mu´minin . The first to assume the title of Sultan was Fodio's son Muhammed Bello, who ruled from 1817 to 1837. Since the creation of the title, there have been nineteen Sultans of Sokoto, all men from the Torodbe scholar caste who are descended from Usman dan Fodio. Siddiq Abubakar III was the longest serving Sultan, holding the position for 50 years from 1938 to 1988. The shortest reign was that of Muhammadu Attahiru I, who held the position for five months in 1902–03. The 17th Sultan Ibrahim Dasuki was forcefully deposed in 1996, by the Sani Abacha military government of Nigeria.

Prior to the beginning of the Fulani Jihad of 1804, the ethnic category Fulani was not important for the Torodbe and their literature reveals the ambivalence they had defining Torodbe-Fulani relationships. They adopted the language of the Fulani and much ethos while maintaining a separate, non-ethnic identity. The Torodbe clan at first recruited members from all levels of Sūdānī society, particularly the poorer people.

List of sultans
As mentioned above, the sultans were also styled Amir al-Mu´minin and Sarkin Musulmi ("King of the Muslims", basically the autochthonous form of the former, which is the Arabic style of Caliphs and other independent sovereign Muslim rulers that claim legitimacy from a community of Muslims); Mai, occurring in various sultans' surnames, is another autochthonous title.

Genealogical tree of the sultans of Sokoto

References

Sources and references
Falola, Toyin, (2009) Historical Dictionary of Nigeria Scarecrow Press: Lanham, Md.
Burdon, J. A. (1907) "Sokoto History: Tables of Dates and Genealogy" Journal of the Royal African Society Volume 6, #24.

Sokoto

Muslim dynasties
Sokoto
Sokoto State
Sultans of Sokoto